

Table of the traditional numerals

For counter word, the colloquial set of Hokkien numerals system is used with the exception of 1 and 2 when the number is greater than 10; for example, one should say cha̍p-it (十一) and jī-cha̍p-jī (二十二) for 11 and 22 instead of cha̍p-chi̍t (十蜀) and nn̄g-cha̍p-nn̄g (兩十兩) with no actual meaning. For 0, bô (無, means "nothing") is sometimes used, but usually it is needless to count 0.

Common counters by category

Extended list of counters

See also
Hokkien numerals
Chinese classifier

References

C
Chinese grammar